Statistics of Latvian Higher League in the 1991 season.

Overview
It was contested by 20 teams, and Forums Skonto won the championship.

League standings

References
RSSSF

Latvian SSR Higher League
Football
Latvia